Enterprise Square Five (Traditional Chinese: 企業廣場五期) is a shopping mall and office building complex in Kowloon Bay, Hong Kong. It was developed by Kerry Properties. It opened in June 2007. 

The property comprises the  MegaBox shopping mall and two office buildings. It is the largest single property among the Enterprise Square properties, occupying  and costing HK$2 billion to build. Hang Seng Bank is the biggest tenant that rent the entire Block 2.

MegaBox

MegaBox occupies  and has 19 floors.

See also
 List of tallest buildings in Hong Kong

References

External links

Megabox shopping mall

Kerry Properties
Kowloon Bay